Swami Niranjanananda may refer to:

 Swami Niranjanananda (Niranjan Maharaj) (1862–1904), a (Sri Ramakrishna Math) guru from Bengal
 Niranjanananda Saraswati (1960– ), a guru practising in Bihar